The 2011 Nova Scotia Scotties Tournament of Hearts was held January 25–30 at the Glooscap Curling Club in Kentville, Nova Scotia. The winning team of Heather Smith-Dacey  represented Nova Scotia at the 2011 Scotties Tournament of Hearts in Charlottetown, Prince Edward Island. They finished round robin play with a record of 7-4, winning a tiebreaker against British Columbia. The team lost the 3-4 page playoff game against Ontario, but rebounded by winning the Bronze Medal Game against the same team from Ontario.

Teams

Standings

Results

Draw 1
January 26 9:00 AM

Draw 2
January 26 3:00 PM

Draw 3
January 27  1:00 PM

Draw 4
January 27 7:00 PM ,

Draw 5
January 28  1:00 PM

Draw 6
January 28  7:00 PM

Draw 7
January 29  9:00 AM

Playoffs

Semifinal
January 29, 7:00 PM

Final
January 30, 3:00 PM

Qualification round 1

The first qualification round for the 2011 Nova Scotties Tournament of Hearts took place December 10–12, 2010 at the 14 Wing Greenwood Curling Club in Greenwood, Nova Scotia. The format of play was an open-entry triple knockout qualifying six teams to the Provincial playoffs at the Glooscap Curling Club in Kentville, Nova Scotia, January 25–30, 2011.

Teams

A Event

B Event

C Event

D Event

E Event

F Event

Qualification round 2

The second qualification round for the 2011 Nova Scotties Tournament of Hearts took place January 7–9, 2010 at the Halifax Curling Club in Halifax, Nova Scotia. The format of play was an open-entry double knockout qualifying two teams to the Provincial playoffs at the Glooscap Curling Club in Kentville, Nova Scotia, January 25–30, 2011.

Teams

A Event

B Event

References

2011 in Canadian curling
2011 Scotties Tournament of Hearts
Curling in Nova Scotia
2011 in Nova Scotia
January 2011 sports events in Canada